General elections were held in Liechtenstein in September and October 1914.

Electors 
Electors were selected through elections that were held between 9 and 14 September. Each municipality had two electors for every 100 inhabitants.

Results 
The election of Oberland's Landtag members and substitutes was held on 30 September in Vaduz. Of Oberland's 140 electors, 137 were present. Oberland elected seven Landtag members and five substitutes.

The election of Unterland's Landtag members and substitutes was held on 2 October in Mauren. Of Unterland's 76 electors, 75 were present. Unterland elected five Landtag members and two substitute.

References 

Liechtenstein
1914 in Liechtenstein
Elections in Liechtenstein
September 1910 events